The 2005 WNBA season was the eighth for the Detroit Shock. Although they played mediocre basketball, the Shock barely made the playoffs, as they eventually made a quick exit from the playoffs, losing in a sweep by the Connecticut Sun.

Offseason

WNBA Draft

Regular season

Season standings

Season schedule

Playoffs

Player stats

Awards and honors
Cheryl Ford, WNBA Peak Performer

References

External links
Shock on Basketball Reference

Detroit Shock seasons
Detroit
Detroit Shock